Rhode Island Reds FC was established in 2012 as a semi-professional men's soccer team competing in the Atlantic Conference (Northeast Region) of NPSL, the fourth-tier soccer league in the United States. The crest, designed with ties to the state and flag, features the state's bird—a Rhode Island Red—surrounded by thirteen stars to symbolize Rhode Island becoming the thirteenth state in the union and includes an anchor at the bottom symbolizing the state motto: hope. The team finished fourth out of eight teams in 2013. In 2013, 2014, 2015 and 2016 the RI Reds finished in third in the conference, fourth in 2017  and 2018.

References

External links
 

National Premier Soccer League teams
Association football clubs established in 2012
2012 establishments in Rhode Island
Soccer clubs in Rhode Island
Sports in Providence, Rhode Island
Women's soccer clubs in the United States